Archibald Ritchie (11 May 1894 – 24 November 1973) was a Scottish footballer who played for Stenhousemuir, Dumbarton, Rangers and Derby County.

References

1894 births
1973 deaths
Scottish footballers
Dumbarton F.C. players
Rangers F.C. players
Derby County F.C. players
Stenhousemuir F.C. players
Scottish Football League players
English Football League players
Association football defenders
Denny Hibernian F.C. players
Scottish Junior Football Association players
People from Stenhousemuir
Footballers from Falkirk (council area)